The Regent Theatre is a theatre in Dunedin, New Zealand with a seating capacity of about 1,650. It is in The Octagon, the city's central plaza, directly opposite the Municipal Chambers (Dunedin Town Hall) and close to the Dunedin Public Art Gallery.

Originally a 2,000 seat cinema the Regent opened on 1 June 1928, and the interior is elaborately decorated in a revived baroque style, characteristic of the super cinemas of the time. The design is a variation of Robert Atkinson's for the 1921 Regent cinema in Brighton, England, which was demolished in 1974. There were comparable picture palaces in other cities in Britain and Australia, few of which now survive and, apart from the Dunedin building, none in their original form. (There was one in Brisbane which survived until recently, Regent Theatre (Brisbane), another in Sydney, Regent Theatre (Sydney) demolished in 1988, and a still existing but re-modelled structure in Melbourne, Regent Melbourne.) All these designs are descended from Charles Garnier's for the Paris Opera, (palais Garnier) completed in 1875. The Regent's auditorium succeeds in replaying the exuberance of the original in a very different time and space.

The Dunedin building's supervising architect was James Hodge White (1896–1970), one of the founders of the Dunedin architectural firm Miller White & Dunn. It was sited behind a building on the Octagon designed by David Ross (1828–1908) which was first opened in 1876. The Octagon building was given an additional storey in 1880 and remodelled at the ground floor in 1928 to provide the present theatre entrance.

Purchased by the Otago Theatre Trust in 1973, the building has since been adapted to work as a live venue, although it still also functions as a cinema during film festivals every year. It is now owned by the Dunedin City Council.

At the end of 2010, the theatre began $7.5 million refurbishments including upgrading the flying system, replacing the chairs, carpet and other work. It was re-opened on 30 July 2011 with a 'thank you' concert for sponsors.

Annual book sale

As it is run by a charitable trust, the theatre relies on the support of the local community for its continued existence.

A major part of this support is the Regent 24-hour Book Sale, the largest sale of second-hand books in New Zealand, and reputedly the largest in the Southern Hemisphere. Every May since 1979, books donated by the general public are sold at the theatre by volunteers over the course of 24 hours. Over 200,000 books are on sale each year, most of them priced at NZ$1 each (although a smaller number of specialist books are on sale at a higher price). The price of an ordinary book was 50c until 2008, when it was doubled. Buyers come from throughout New Zealand for the sale, which has become a major event on Dunedin's calendar, and raises around $100,000 annually.

Claimed hauntings 
Two theatre patrons claimed feeling someone or something kicking the underside of a seat. The theatre has a reported ghost story history.

References

External links

Regent Theatre
"Scoop" article on the book sale's 25th anniversary

Heritage New Zealand Category 1 historic places in Otago
Theatres in Dunedin
Event venues established in 1928
The Octagon, Dunedin
1920s architecture in New Zealand
Book fairs in New Zealand
Events in Dunedin
Reportedly haunted locations in Dunedin